The  Illinois lunar sample displays  are two commemorative plaques consisting of small fragments of Moon specimen brought back with the Apollo 11 and Apollo 17 lunar missions and given in the 1970s to the people of Illinois by United States President Richard Nixon as goodwill gifts.

Description

Apollo 11

Apollo 17

History 

The Illinois Apollo 11 "goodwill Moon rocks" plaque display was presented by Illinois Governor Richard Ogilvie to Milton D. Thompson, Director of the Illinois State Museum. Richard Leary, curator of geology, ultimately handled the display. 

While other "goodwill Moon rocks" commemorative displays were reported lost or missing, both the Illinois Apollo 11 and Apollo 17 displays are kept at the Illinois State Museum.

See also
 List of Apollo lunar sample displays

References

Further reading 

 

Apollo program lunar sample displays
Apollo program
Lunar science
Tourist attractions in Illinois